Ricardo Morello (born 6 July 1943) is a former swimmer from Argentina. He competed in the men's 1500 metre freestyle at the 1964 Summer Olympics.

References

1943 births
Living people
Argentine male swimmers
Olympic swimmers of Argentina
Swimmers at the 1964 Summer Olympics
Place of birth missing (living people)
20th-century Argentine people